A constitutional referendum was held in French Sudan and Niger on 21 October 1945 as part of the wider French constitutional referendum. The first question on the new French National Assembly serving as a constituent assembly was approved by 97% of voters, whilst the temporary constitution proposed in the second question was approved by 86% of voters. Both proposals were also approved in the overall vote. Voter turnout was 79.3%.

Results

Question I

Question II

References

1945 referendums
1945
1945 in French Sudan
1945
1945 in Niger